Condon Air Force Station is a closed United States Air Force General Surveillance Radar station. It was closed in 1970.

History
Condon AFS was one of twenty-eight stations built as part of the second segment of the Air Defense Command permanent radar network. Prompted by the start of the Korean War, on July 11, 1950, the Secretary of the Air Force asked the Secretary of Defense for approval to expedite construction of the permanent network. Receiving the Defense Secretary's approval on July 21, the Air Force directed the Corps of Engineers to proceed with construction.

The 636th Aircraft Control and Warning Squadron was assigned to the station on 15 August 1951, and initially the station functioned as a Ground-Control Intercept (GCI) and warning station.  As a GCI station, the squadron's role was to guide interceptor aircraft toward unidentified intruders picked up on the unit's radar scopes.   By 1952 the squadron was operating AN/FPS-3 search and AN/FPS-4 height-finder radars at Condon. These sets were replaced in 1957 and 1958 with AN/FPS-20 and AN/FPS-6 radars. In 1959 a second height-finder radar came with the installation of an AN/FPS-6A.

During 1960 Condon AFS joined the Semi Automatic Ground Environment (SAGE) system, feeding data to DC-15 at  Larson AFB, Washington.  After joining, the squadron was redesignated as the 636th Radar Squadron (SAGE) on 8 September 1960.  The radar squadron provided information 24/7 to the SAGE Direction Center where it was analyzed to determine range, direction, altitude, speed, and whether or not aircraft were friendly or hostile.  The AN/FPS-20 subsequently was upgraded in 1961 and redesignated as an AN/FPS-66.  On 31 July 1963, the site was redesignated as NORAD ID Z-32.

In 1964 an AN/FPS-27 search radar was installed and in 1965 the AN/FPS-66 was relocated to Burns AFS, OR, to replace the AN/FPS-7B search radar there.

The Air Force inactivated the 636th Radar Squadron (SAGE) on 30 September 1970 as a result of budget restrictions, and the general phase down of air defense radar stations.  Most of the site has been redeveloped for commercial use, the housing area being used as single-family homes.

Air Force units and assignments 

Units:
 636th Aircraft Control and Warning Squadron activated on 21 May 1947 at Hamilton AFB, CA
 Moved to Condon AFS, Oregon from McChord AFB, Washington on 27 June 1951
 Redesignated 636th Radar Squadron (SAGE) on 8 September 1960
 Inactivated on 30 September 1970

Assignments:
 505th Aircraft Control and Warning Group
 25th Air Division, 6 February 1952
 4702d Defense Wing, 1 January 1953
 9th Air Division, 8 October 1954
 25th Air Division, 15 August 1958
 4700th Air Defense Wing, 1 September 1958
 Spokane Air Defense Sector, 15 March 1960
 Seattle Air Defense Sector, 1 June 1963
 26th Air Division, 1 April 1966
 25th Air Division, 15 September 1969 – 30 September 1970

See also
 List of USAF Aerospace Defense Command General Surveillance Radar Stations
 List of United States Air Force aircraft control and warning squadrons

References

 
 
 Information for Condon AFS, OR

Installations of the United States Air Force in Oregon
Semi-Automatic Ground Environment sites
Aerospace Defense Command military installations
Buildings and structures in Gilliam County, Oregon
1951 establishments in Oregon
1970 disestablishments in Oregon
Military installations established in 1951
Military installations closed in 1970